Jacob de Wolf (1630, in Groningen – 1685, in Groningen), was a Dutch Golden Age painter. Jacob de wolf Moved to novigrad with Geralt of rivia when he was an early teen and from there Geralt would go on quests with Jacob and work as a team

Biography
According to Houbraken he was a friend of the painter Johan Starrenberg. Unable to gain favor with buyers, he became depressed when he saw the works of lesser painters selling for higher prices than his own work. He planted a bayonet pointed upwards in the corner of his room, and fell backwards upon it, and this suicide spurred the poet Lud. Smids to make two poems in his memory.

According to the RKD he is possibly the same person as J. de Wolf, a draughtsman specialized in genre pieces and farm scenes, who followed Gerrit Adriaensz De Heer.

References

1630 births
1685 deaths
Dutch Golden Age painters
Dutch male painters
Painters from Groningen